The Young Greens of England and Wales (YGEW) is the official youth branch of the Green Party of England and Wales (GPEW). All members of the GPEW who are under 30 years old and/or full or part-time students are members of the Young Greens and are allowed to get involved with their activities.

The Scottish Green Party also has a youth branch, the Scottish Young Greens, who work with the England and Wales group. Young Greens is affiliated with the Federation of Young European Greens (FYEG).

History

From 4 March to 6 March 1988, around 70 green students from across the country, including Gail Bradbrook, founded Green Party Students successioning from the Green Students Network, and formed a Coordinating Group. They soon had green groups, societies etc, mostly from universities and colleges - over 100 addresses on the mailing list. It's all documented in great detail and much more besides in the first edition of their magazine - Green Student. However the activity dwindled and the Green Student Network was moribund by the end of the millennium. Consequently the Young Greens was set up by young members of the Green Party of England and Wales in 2002. It was officially announced as being founded at the 2002 Scarborough GPEW Spring Conference by Ros Leeming. The organisation aimed to build local groups at universities, colleges, higher education institutions, sixth form colleges and schools, with no lower age limit for joining. It included students of any age due to the previous Green Student Network having been so inclusive, but was even more inclusive as non-students could join. Since then, it has grown to a membership of over 20,000 young members of the Green Party, over 60 local groups and regional groups in the North, the North East, South East, South West, the Midlands and London, as well as working with young people who are in work, unemployed or not in education.

Many Young Greens have been elected to County or City Councils, including Adrian Ramsay the current co-leader of the Green Party in Norwich; Matt Sellwood, a former chair of the Young Greens, in Oxford, as well as Sam Coates also a former Chair, and Ash Haynes, a former Co-Chair and youngest ever Green councillor, in Norwich.

The Green Party of England and Wales' deputy leader, Amelia Womack is a former member of the Young Greens "30 under 30" training scheme.

Structure
The Young Greens is governed by a constitution, the original being adopted at a Young Greens meeting at the Green Party's 2014 Autumn Conference. A new constitution was adopted by the Young Greens Convention in October 2017. The group has an executive known as the Young Greens Executive Committee. The Committee is assisted by the Young Greens Coordinator who is employed by the Green Party and works at the party office.

Executive committee 
The Executive Committee consists of twenty positions: two gender-balanced co-chairs, a treasurer, the two Green Students Committee Co-convenors, eight portfolio officers, six liberation group officers, and one officer representing the affiliated group, Under 18s Young Greens. The current holders of these positions are as follows:

Elected to serve from Spring 2022 - Spring 2023.

Campaigning
The Young Greens have a national campaign called "Fair Pay Campus". The campaign aims to achieve a living wage for all staff, including contracted staff, working at universities; transparency of the pay of Vice-Chancellors and senior management; and a pay ratio no more than 10:1 of highest and lowest paid employees at any individual university.

On 17 October 2013, the Young Greens released a report called "The Fair Pay League" which analysed the pay conditions at UK universities and ranked them in a league table. The report received coverage in various publications including Times Higher Education and The Independent. Imperial College London and London Business School were highlighted as "worst performers" and University of London and the School of Oriental and African Studies were highlighted as "best performers".

At Green Party Autumn Conference in September 2014, the Young Greens launched a new campaign called Get Organised! The campaign is aimed at getting Young Green Groups to work with Trade Unions locally and to encourage young people to join Trade Unions.

Representation
Young Greens regularly contest elections at all levels of government, and are actively involved and represented within bodies such as Students' Unions and the National Union of Students (NUS).

National government 
Though there are no Young Greens elected to Westminster, members of the party and executive regularly stand for elections to it. In the 2017 General Election, around 35 members of the Young Greens stood for election to Westminster, including former Co-Chair Hannah Ellen Clare (Harlow, 660 votes), former Executive Committee members Alice Kiff (Birmingham Edgbaston, 562 votes) and Arran Rangi (Ashfield, 398 votes), and current Executive Committee member Nate Higgins (West Lancashire, 680 votes).

Local government 
A number of Young Greens hold positions in local government including Lucy Pegg, Jamie Osborn, Harry Gorman, Sarah Tubbs, Emily Fedorowycz and Jessie Carter. Former Young Greens co-chair Lily Fitzgibbon was elected to represent Bishopston and Ashley Down in May 2021.

European Parliament 

Young Green Party Member Magid Magid and former Lord Mayor of Sheffield City Council. was elected onto the European Parliament in the Yorkshire & Humber region in the May 2019 European Elections.

National Union of Students of the United Kingdom
At the 2006 NUS Conference in Blackpool, Young Green, Joe Rooney was elected to the 'Block of Twelve' on the NUS UK National Executive Committee (NEC) standing on the Education Not for Sale slate. In 2008, Joe Blakesley was elected as an FE officer on the NUS Wales NEC and to NUS UK Council.

There have been a number of Young Green sabbatical officers with Student Unions such as LSE, Portsmouth, Keele Postgraduate Association, Manchester, Warwick, Teesside and Edinburgh. Young Greens have held non-sabbatical positions at many more campuses including Aberystwyth, Cardiff, Royal Holloway and Stanmore College.

In 2014 Young Greens Co-Chair Clifford Fleming and Green Party member Hannah Graham were elected to the NUS block of 15.

See also
 Green Left (England and Wales)
 Green Party of England and Wales
 Federation of Young European Greens (FYEG)

References

External links
 Young Greens website
 Green Party of England and Wales website
 Federation of Young European Greens (FYEG) Website

Green Party of England and Wales
Youth wings of green parties in Europe
Green
2003 establishments in the United Kingdom